Manuel Duran Moreno  (November 27, 1930 – November 17, 2006) was an American
bishop of the Roman Catholic Church. He was the sixth Bishop of Tucson.

Biography
Bishop Moreno was born in Placentia, California, to Antonio and Enedina Moreno. His father was a worker in the citrus and walnut groves that surrounded Placentia and nearby Fullerton, and young Manuel often worked with him in the groves.

Bishop Moreno graduated from Fullerton Junior College and UCLA where, in 1953, he received a degree in business administration. It was during his years at UCLA that he began to consider the possibility of becoming a priest of the Roman Catholic Church.

After graduation, instead of beginning a business career, he began preparation for the vocation of the priesthood, entering Our Lady Queen of Angels Seminary in San Fernando, California. He completed his preparation and studies at St. John’s Seminary in Camarillo, California, and was ordained on April 25, 1961. As a new priest, he continued his studies at the graduate division of the North American College in Rome and then returned to Los Angeles for his first parish assignment.

On December 20, 1976, Pope Paul VI named Moreno an auxiliary bishop of Los Angeles, and on February 17, 1977, he was consecrated by Cardinal Timothy Manning. On January 12, 1982, Pope John Paul II appointed him Bishop of Tucson.

On October 30, 2001, Pope John Paul II appointed Gerald F. Kicanas as coadjutor Bishop of Tucson, and Kicanas succeeded Moreno when he resigned as bishop in March 2003.

Moreno died on November 17, 2006, at his Tucson home where he had been receiving hospice care.

References

1930 births
Roman Catholic bishops of Tucson
University of California, Los Angeles alumni
People from Placentia, California
2006 deaths
Catholics from California
20th-century Roman Catholic bishops in the United States